The Fairmile A motor launch was a type of motor launch designed by Fairmile Marine for the Royal Navy.

Development
Shortly before the Second World War the British industrialist Noel Macklin submitted to the Admiralty an innovative plan for the series production of a motor launch (vessels for harbour defence and submarine chasing). The design used prefabricated parts, which allowed various small concerns, such as furniture and piano manufacturers, to produce the individual components. These components could then be assembled in separate shipyards. The hull was to be made of double diagonal mahogany planking with plywood frames divided into nine watertight compartments.

The Admiralty rejected the concept, and so the prototype was built as a private venture. In July 1939, two months before the outbreak of war, the Admiralty had a change of heart and awarded Macklin a contract to build eleven further Type A Fairmiles.

Service

The first vessel (ML100) was not completed until May 1940 because of handling problems at low speeds, although the subsequent boats had all entered service by July. Their role was to be anti-submarine escorts in coastal waters, but, once the better Fairmile B motor launches began to enter service in the autumn of 1940, the Type A boats were converted to minelayers.

See also
 Fairmile B motor launch
 Fairmile C motor gun boat
 Fairmile D motor torpedo boat
 Fairmile H landing craft
Coastal Forces of the Royal Navy

References

 Allied Coastal Forces of World War Two, Volume I : Fairmile designs and US Submarine Chasers - by John Lambert and Al Ross - 1990,

External links

The origins of the Fairmiles
Allied Coastal Forces of World War II
 Fairmile A and C types

Auxiliary search and rescue ship classes
Gunboat classes
Gunboats of the Royal Navy
Military boats
Patrol boat classes
Ship classes of the Royal Navy
Submarine chaser classes